Tuoba Xilu 拓跋悉鹿 Tuòbá Xīlù (died 286), chieftain of the Tuoba (277–286). His father was the Tuoba chieftain Tuoba Liwei, and he was the brother of  Tuoba Shamohan, Tuoba Chuo, and Tuoba Luguan. In 286, he was succeeded by his younger brother Tuoba Chuo as chieftain of the Tuoba.

References

286 deaths
Year of birth unknown
Chieftains of the Tuoba clan